Danish Squash Federation ("Dansk Squash Forbund" in Danish) is the National Organisation for Squash in Denmark.

References

External links
 Official site

See also
 Denmark men's national squash team

Squash in Denmark
National members of the World Squash Federation
Squash